Yahor Varapayeu (born 13 December 1996) is a Belarusian judoka.

He is the silver medallist of the 2018 Judo Grand Slam Ekaterinburg in the -90 kg category.

References

External links
 

1996 births
Living people
Belarusian male judoka
European Games competitors for Belarus
Judoka at the 2019 European Games
20th-century Belarusian people
21st-century Belarusian people